John McKilligan (born August 28, 1948) was a Canadian pair skater.  With partner Betty McKilligan, he won the gold medal at the Canadian Figure Skating Championships in 1967 and 1968 and competed in the 1968 Winter Olympics.

Results
pairs with Betty McKilligan

Notes

Navigation

1948 births
Canadian male pair skaters
Figure skaters at the 1968 Winter Olympics
Olympic figure skaters of Canada
Living people